"Hurting the feelings of the Chinese people" is a political catchphrase used by the Ministry of Foreign Affairs of the People's Republic of China, in addition to Chinese state media organisations and Chinese Communist Party–affiliated news outlets such as the People's Daily, the China Daily and Xinhua News Agency to express dissatisfaction or condemnation against the words, actions or policies of a person, organisation, or government that are perceived to be of an adversarial nature towards China, through the adoption of an argumentum ad populum position against the condemned target. Alternative forms of the catchphrase include "hurting the feelings of 1.3 billion people" and "hurting the feelings of the Chinese nation".

Origin
The phrase first appeared in 1959 in the People's Daily, where it was used to criticise India following a border dispute. In the decades that followed, the phrase has been regularly used to express displeasure of the Chinese government via its various official communication channels. Targets accused of having "hurt the feelings of the Chinese people" range from national governments and international organisations, to companies such as automakers, newspapers, luxury jewellers, and hotel chains, in addition to outspoken individuals including sportspeople, business executives, film actors, and music performers. Although bureaucratic in origin, ordinary people have also become encouraged to use the expression to display dissatisfaction against criticism targeting China as well.

Phraseology

A study conducted by David Bandurski as part of the China Media Project at the University of Hong Kong selected 143 text samples of the phrase from excerpts from the People's Daily published between 1959 and 2015; from this sample, Japan was most frequently accused of "hurting the feelings of the Chinese people" with 51 occurrences, while the United States ranked second at 35 occurrences. In terms of specific issues which drew condemnation through the catchphrase, 28 were in relation to the political status of Taiwan, while the Tibetan sovereignty debate drew condemnation with the phrase 12 times.

A December 2008 Time article used an informal statistical survey to analyse the occurrence of the phrase within People's Daily publications, pointing out that during the period between 1946 and 2006 there were more than one hundred articles that made accusations against a target that had "hurt the feelings of the Chinese people".

Victor H. Mair wrote in 2011 that while the phrase "hurt the feelings of the Chinese people" resulted in 17,000 online hits, rewriting the phrase as "hurt the feelings of the Japanese people" only yields 178 hits, and the same phrase rewritten with 17 other nationalities provides zero hits. In addition, use of the keywords "bullying" and "looking down upon" results in 623,000 Google hits for "bullying China", and 521,000 hits for "looking down upon Chinese people".

Horng-luen Wang, an associate researcher at the Institute of Sociology at Academia Sinica in Taiwan, found that there were 319 instances of "hurt the feelings of the Chinese people" in the People's Daily from 1949 to 2013, based on data obtained from the People's Daily database.

Criticism
In August 2016, Merriden Varrall, Director of the East Asia Program at the Lowy Institute in Sydney, Australia, published an opinion piece in The New York Times titled "A Chinese Threat to Australian Openness" in which she described a trend where many of the 150,000 Chinese international students in Australia introduce pro-China stances into the classroom while attempting to stifle debate that does not match the official viewpoint of China; later in September 2016, another opinion piece by Varrall in The Guardian expressed that while Chinese students in Australia would frequently use the phrase "hurt the feelings of the Chinese people" whenever China received international criticism, such phrasing is only ever used within the context of China and would never be used by those of other nationalities, such as Australians, to condemn criticism of their own countries.

A February 2016 piece in The Economist commented that the supposed outrage of the people is often utilised as a tool to allow the Chinese Communist Party to abandon its official diplomatic principle of non-interference in the internal affairs of other countries, for instance when China releases official statements claiming that the visits of Japanese politicians to Yasukuni Shrine hurt the feelings of the Chinese people, it is able to express dissatisfaction towards the visits on behalf of the people rather than as an official government statement or position.

Historical events

United States

In August 1980, Xinhua News Agency accused US presidential candidate Ronald Reagan of having "deeply hurt the feelings of the 1 billion Chinese people" and "given rise to widespread concern and indignation in China", after Reagan made the suggestion that the United States should open a governmental liaison office in Taiwan. An April 9, 1983 article in the People's Daily argued that the United States had "made a whole series of moves that hurt the Chinese people's dignity, feelings, and interests", in reference to US military arms sales to Taiwan, the status of Taiwan in the Asian Development Bank, and the defection of Chinese tennis player Hu Na while in California.

Following the Tiananmen Square crackdown in 1989, US congressional actions targeting the Chinese government more than doubled, and in response, the Chinese assistant foreign minister expressed to the US ambassador that the new bills "attacked China and interfered in its internal affairs", and that "such activities by the US Congress hurt the feelings of the 1.1 billion Chinese people".

After the Hainan Island incident in 2001 where a US Navy signals intelligence aircraft collided with a People's Liberation Army Navy interceptor, Chinese government representatives rejected the United States' request to repair the US Navy aircraft on Chinese soil and have it fly back to base, instead insisting that the plane be dismantled and returned to the US, stating that allowing the US to fly back would "hurt the feelings of the Chinese people".

Presidents Bill Clinton, George W. Bush and Barack Obama have all been accused by Chinese foreign ministry spokespersons and foreign ministers of "hurting the feelings of the Chinese people" in relation to their respective meetings with the 14th Dalai Lama.

Japan

Following Japanese prime minister Yasuhiro Nakasone's visit to Yasukuni Shrine in 1985, the People's Daily wrote that the visit "hurt the feelings of both Chinese and Japanese peoples who were victims of Japanese militarism". Prime minister Junichiro Koizumi's regular visits to Yasukuni Shrine from 2001 to 2006 have likewise been criticised by Chinese foreign ministry spokeswoman Zhang Qiyue as having "hurt the feelings of the Chinese people and the people of the majority of victimized countries in Asia", by Chinese foreign minister Li Zhaoxing as having "hurt the feelings of the Chinese people" as he blamed the visits for anti-Japan protests in China, and by Chinese commerce minister Bo Xilai as "severely hurting the Chinese people's feelings and damaging the political foundation for bilateral ties".

On September 15, 2012, after the Japanese government nationalised control over three of the privately owned islands within the Senkaku Islands, the Xinhua News Agency stated that the move "hurt the feelings of 1.3 billion Chinese people".

Holy See
On October 1, 2000, Pope John Paul II canonised 120 missionaries and adherents who died in China during the Qing Dynasty and Republican era; in response, the People's Daily expressed that the move "greatly hurt the feelings of the Chinese race and is a serious provocation to the 1.2 billion people of China". The Chinese Ministry of Foreign Affairs issued a statement stating that the Vatican "seriously hurt the feelings of the Chinese people and the dignity of the Chinese nation".

In 2005, the Chinese Patriotic Catholic Association (the organisation established by the State Administration for Religious Affairs of the State Council of the People's Republic of China to supervise Catholics in China) stated that the attendance of Taiwanese president Chen Shui-bian at Pope John Paul II's funeral "hurt the feelings of the Chinese people, including five million Catholics".

Europe
In 2000, the Swedish Academy awarded the Nobel Prize in Literature to Gao Xingjian; the People's Daily wrote that the "regressive actions" had "greatly hurt the feelings of the Chinese race, and are a serious provocation to the 1.2 billion people of China".

On September 24, 2007, Chinese foreign ministry spokesperson Jiang Yu expressed that German chancellor Angela Merkel's meeting with the 14th Dalai Lama "hurt the feelings of the Chinese people and seriously undermined China-Germany relations". The 14th Dalai Lama's later meeting with French president Nicolas Sarkozy in December 2008 drew similar criticisms, with the Chinese Ministry of Foreign Affairs releasing a press statement insisting that Sarkozy's actions "constitute gross interference in China's internal affairs and offend the feelings of the Chinese people"; Xinhua News Agency likewise condemned Sarkozy's meeting as "not only hurting the feelings of the Chinese people, but also undermining Sino-French relations". British prime minister David Cameron's 2012 meeting with the 14th Dalai Lama also received identical accusations of hurt feelings.

On October 23, 2008, the European Parliament awarded the 2008 Sakharov Prize to social activist Hu Jia. Prior to the announcement, China had put extensive pressure on the European Parliament to prevent Hu Jia from winning the award, with Chinese Ambassador to the European Union Song Zhe writing a warning letter to the President of the European Parliament stating that should Hu Jia receive the prize, it would seriously damage Sino-European relations and "hurt the feelings of the Chinese people".

Canada
On October 29, 2007, Canadian prime minister Stephen Harper met with the 14th Dalai Lama; in response, Chinese foreign ministry spokesman Liu Jianchao stated in a news briefing that the "disgusting conduct has seriously hurt the feelings of the Chinese people and undermined Sino-Canadian relations".

Following the arrest of Huawei chief financial officer Meng Wanzhou in December 2018, Xinhua News Agency accused Canada of assisting American hegemonic behaviour, an act which "hurt the feelings of the Chinese people".

Mexico

On September 9, 2011, Mexican president Felipe Calderón met with the 14th Dalai Lama; on the 10th, Chinese foreign ministry spokesperson Ma Zhaoxu made an official statement stating that China expressed strong dissatisfaction and resolute opposition to the meeting, and that the meeting "hurt the feelings of the Chinese people".

Hong Kong
On October 13, 2016, the Government of Hong Kong condemned lawmakers Leung Chung-hang and Yau Wai-ching as having "harmed the feelings of our compatriots" in a written statement, following allegations that they intentionally pronounced the word "China" as "", the Cantonese pronunciation of the Japanese ethnic slur , during their swearing-in ceremony; Xinhua News Agency reported that a representative of the Hong Kong Liaison Office made an official statement condemning the act as "challenging the nation's dignity and severely hurting the feelings of all Chinese people and overseas Chinese, including Hong Kong compatriots".

On August 3, 2019, during the 2019–20 Hong Kong protests, an unknown protester lowered the national flag of China at Tsim Sha Tsui and threw it into the sea; the Hong Kong and Macau Affairs Office issued a statement condemning "extremist radicals who have seriously violated the National Flag Law of the People's Republic of China... flagrantly offending the dignity of the country and the nation, wantonly trampling on the baseline of the one country, two systems principle, and greatly hurting the feelings of all Chinese people".

Glory to Hong Kong 
In November 2022, after a rugby match in South Korea played Glory to Hong Kong for the Hong Kong team, lawmaker Starry Lee said that Asia Rugby should apologize to "the entire [Chinese] population." In December 2022, security chief Chris Tang appealed to Google to "correct" the search results to list March of the Volunteers instead of Glory to Hong Kong when searching for the national anthem of Hong Kong, and said that the song being the top result hurt the feelings of Hong Kong people.

Australia
On August 26, 2020, China's deputy ambassador to Australia, Wang Xining, expressed that Australia's co-proposal for an independent investigation into the causes of the COVID-19 pandemic "hurts the feelings of the Chinese people" during his address to the National Press Club of Australia.

Czech Republic 
On 31 January 2023, after Czech President-elect Petr Pavel conducted a phone call with Tsai Ing-wen from Taiwan, foreign ministry spokeswoman Mao Ning said that "Pavel... trampled on China's red line" and that "This severely interferes in China's internal affairs and has hurt the feelings of the Chinese people."

See also 
 China's final warning
 Fragile (Namewee song)

Notes

References

Foreign relations of China
Political catchphrases